Valentin Ignatyevich Filatyev (21 January 1930 – 15 September 1990) was a Soviet cosmonaut who was dismissed from the Soviet space program for disciplinary reasons.  

Senior Lieutenant Filatyev, age 30, was selected as one of the original 20 cosmonauts on 7 March 1960 along with Yuri Gagarin. 

On 27 March 1963 Filatyev, Grigory Nelyubov and Ivan Anikeyev were arrested for drunk and disorderly conduct by the militia at Chkalovsky station.  According to reports, the officers of the security patrol that arrested them were willing to ignore the whole incident if the cosmonauts apologized; Filatyev and Anikeyev agreed but Nelyubov refused, and the matter was reported to the authorities. Because there had been previous incidents, all three were dismissed from the cosmonaut corps on 17 April 1963, though officially not until 4 May 1963. Filatyev never went on a space mission. Following his dismissal, he eventually became a teacher.

To protect the image of the space program, efforts were made to cover up the reason for Filatyev's dismissal. His image was airbrushed out of cosmonaut photos. This airbrushing led to speculation about "lost cosmonauts" even though the actual reasons were often mundane.

References

External links
 Details of the Soviet training program and launch
 Biographical details
 Titov recounts about disappearing cosmonauts #4 Research topic
 Straight Dope entry about lost cosmonauts

1930 births
1990 deaths
Soviet cosmonauts